Waynesville may refer to a place in the United States:

Waynesville, Georgia
Waynesville, Illinois
Waynesville, Indiana
Waynesville, Missouri
Waynesville, North Carolina
Waynesville, Ohio